"Big Guns" is the seventh episode of the third series of the British comedy series Dad's Army. It was originally transmitted on Thursday 23 October 1969.

Synopsis
The platoon is given heavy artillery and, directly in the line of fire of their naval gun, the town's bandstand is at grave risk.

Plot
Captain Mainwaring and Sergeant Wilson are discussing a church parade in the Vicar's office when they are interrupted by the Verger, accompanied by an official from Pickfords, complaining that a large gun has been left in the yard. It is revealed to be a 13 pounder naval gun. The platoon call in Frazer, who was in the navy, to tell them how it works, but Frazer reveals that he was only a cook. The man from Pickfords returns with the manual however, and Mainwaring begins to read it.

The platoon are each assigned different positions, with amusing consequences. However, when they attempt to rehearse the drill, they cannot open the breech until the verger reveals that they had the safety catch on, to the indignation of the platoon.

The next day, the platoon organise a TEWT (Tactical Exercise Without Troops) and make a miniature version of Walmington to test their new battle strategy, using, among other things, a powder puff, a scrubbing brush and a bottle of whisky. Mainwaring orders the destruction of the cricket score-board (much to Wilson's annoyance), the allotments (to Frazer's disapproval) and the bandstand (to the dismay of Lance Corporal Jones, who reveals that he was present when it was erected and dedicated to Queen Victoria) within 48 hours. He tells Wilson he is meeting with Mr Rees, the Town Clerk to confirm it. However, Mr Rees is less than pleased, and asks for a demonstration.

On the day of the demonstration, Mainwaring gives the command "enemy tank right! Action!", and the platoon jump to it. However, the gun is covered by camouflage netting, which proves to be the downfall of the platoon as they all become entangled in the netting whilst attempting to remove it. Mr Rees has had enough at this point, and promises to tell his committee that "they can sleep sound in their beds, provided they make them inside that enemy tank".

Cast

Arthur Lowe as Captain Mainwaring
John Le Mesurier as Sergeant Wilson
Clive Dunn as Lance Corporal Jones
John Laurie as Private Frazer
James Beck as Private Walker
Arnold Ridley as Private Godfrey
Ian Lavender as Private Pike
Edward Sinclair as The Verger
Edward Evans as Mr Rees, the Town Clerk
Don Estelle as The Pickfords Man
Roy Denton as Mr Bennett

Further reading

External links

    

Dad's Army (series 3) episodes
1969 British television episodes